Rissoina plicata is a species of minute sea snail, a marine gastropod mollusk or micromollusk in the family Rissoinidae.

Description
The height of the shell attains  6.3 mm.

Distribution
This species occurs in the Red Sea and in the Indian Ocean off the Chagos Archipelago and Aldabra; in the Pacific Ocean off Japan; in the Easter Mediterranean Sea.

References

 Sheppard, A (1984). The molluscan fauna of Chagos (Indian Ocean) and an analysis of its broad distribution patterns. Coral Reefs 3: 43-50.

External links
 

Rissoinidae